Cecily Darwin Littleton (15 November 1926 – 14 April 2022) was a British X-ray crystallographer and horticulturalist. She worked alongside Dorothy Hodgkin on the identification of the crystal structure of biomolecules.

Early life and education 
Littleton was born in Edinburgh. She was the great-granddaughter of Charles Darwin. Her father was Charles Galton Darwin and her mother was a mathematician, Katharine Pember Darwin. Her father worked on atomic theory and X-ray diffraction, and was a member of the Darwin–Wedgwood family. She attended Somerville College, Oxford, where she studied chemistry and graduated in 1949. At Oxford, she worked alongside Dorothy Hodgkin. Together they worked on the structure of biomolecules, including nitrosobenzenes.

Research and career 
Littleton moved to Philadelphia and worked alongside Arthur Lindo Patterson at the Fox Chase Cancer Center. She developed the statistical analysis techniques to model crystal structures. She also worked at Haverford College, where she studied stellar evolution.

Like her great-grandfather, Littleton travelled to the Galápagos Islands. In 1989, she donated a chair belonging to Charles Darwin to the Academy of Natural Sciences of Drexel University.

Selected publications

Personal life 
Littleton met musician John Littleton, who would later become her husband, at a New Year's Eve party. Together they had four children. He died in 2009. She trained in horticulture in the 1980s. Littleton died on 14 April 2022, of a cardiac arrest.

References 

1926 births
2022 deaths
British crystallographers
British horticulturists
Women horticulturists and gardeners
20th-century British scientists
20th-century British women scientists
Scientists from Edinburgh
Alumni of Somerville College, Oxford
Haverford College
Fox Chase Cancer Center people
Darwin–Wedgwood family